The 2010–11 Irish League Cup (known as the Co-operative Insurance Cup for sponsorship reasons) was the 25th edition of Northern Ireland's secondary football knock-out cup competition. For this season all matches reverted to a one-legged basis having previously been two-legged ties up until the semi-final stage. The competition was also opened up to include more clubs. It was contested by the 12 members of the IFA Premiership, as well as the 14 members of IFA Championship 1 and for the first time, the 16 members of IFA Championship 2 (the third tier). Glentoran were the defending champions.

Lisburn Distillery were the eventual winners, winning the competition for the first time with a 2–1 victory over Portadown in the final.

First round
The games were played in a one-leg format on 21 August 2010.

Second round
These matches were played on 18 September 2010.

|}

Third round
These matches were played on 23 October 2010.

|}

Quarter-finals
These matches were played on 5 December 2010, 11 and 18 January 2011.

|}

Semi-finals

Final

References

External links
 Results

League Cup
2010–11 domestic association football cups
2010